Petauke District is a district of Zambia, located in Eastern Province. The capital lies at Petauke. As of the 2000 Zambian Census, the district had a population of 235,879 people. It consists of two constituencies, namely Petauke Central and Kaumbwe.

References

Districts of Eastern Province, Zambia